Consejo may refer to:

Places
Consejo, a village in Corozal District, Belize
Consejo, Guayanilla, Puerto Rico, a barrio
Consejo, Utuado, Puerto Rico, a barrio